Marici may refer to:
Marici (Ligures), a Ligurian people of Gallia Transpadana
 Marici (Buddhism), Buddhist deity 
Marichi, masculine Sanskrit term for one of the Saptarshis